"I'm Gonna Leave You Tomorrow" is a song written by Gene Dobbins, Tim Daniels and Johnny Wilson, and recorded by actor and American country music artist John Schneider.  It was released in August 1985 as the second single from the album Tryin' to Outrun the Wind.  The song reached number 10 on the Billboard Hot Country Singles & Tracks chart.

Chart performance

References

1985 singles
1985 songs
John Schneider (screen actor) songs
Song recordings produced by Jimmy Bowen
MCA Records singles
Songs written by Gene Dobbins
Songs written by Johnny Wilson (songwriter)